The 1876 Boston Red Caps season was the 6th season of the franchise. With the dissolution of the National Association, the Boston team joined the brand new National League. The team name was changed from the Boston Red Stockings to the Boston Red Caps to avoid confusion with the new Cincinnati Red Stockings team. Some of the players from the previous year's team defected to other ballclubs, so the team finished further down in the standings this season.

Regular season

Season standings

Record vs. opponents

Roster

Player stats

Batting

Starters by position
Note: Pos = Position; G = Games played; AB = At bats; H = Hits; Avg. = Batting average; HR = Home runs; RBI = Runs batted in

Other batters
Note: G = Games played; AB = At bats; H = Hits; Avg. = Batting average; HR = Home runs; RBI = Runs batted in

Pitching

Starting pitchers
Note: G = Games pitched; IP = Innings pitched; W = Wins; L = Losses; ERA = Earned run average; SO = Strikeouts

Other pitchers
Note: G = Games pitched; IP = Innings pitched; W = Wins; L = Losses; ERA = Earned run average; SO = Strikeouts

Relief pitchers
Note: G = Games pitched; W = Wins; L = Losses; SV = Saves; ERA = Earned run average; SO = Strikeouts

References
1876 Boston Red Caps season at Baseball Reference

Boston Red Caps seasons
Boston Red Caps
Boston Red Caps
19th century in Boston